The Academy of Business Administration was established in the year of 1993 by Mr. Sudhasindhu Panda, who is a businessman. The Institution focuses on the education on Business Management. Also it has added the curriculum of IT education . It is affiliated to Fakir Mohan University for its bachelor's degrees & affiliated to Bijupattanaik University of Technology for its Master's degree courses.

Facilities 
As per the Institution it gives a very valuable facility to the students.

The Institution have library, knowledge centre, on-campus hostels & it organises variety types of personality development seminars, competition & classes etc.

Courses offered 
 MBA ( Master of Business Administration)
 MCA (Master of Computer Applications)
 BBA (Bachelor of Business Administration)
 BCA (Bachelor of Computer Applications)

References

Business schools in Odisha
Colleges affiliated with Biju Patnaik University of Technology
Education in Balasore district
Educational institutions established in 1993
1993 establishments in Orissa